The Piel CP.80 Zephir (or Zef), Piel CP.801 and Piel CP.802 are racing aircraft developed in France in the 1970s and marketed for homebuilding. They are compact, single-seat, single-engine monoplanes with low, cantilever wings.

Design and development
The pilots sit in fully enclosed cockpits and the tailwheel undercarriages are fixed. Although designed to be built of wood, the first CP.80 to fly (registered F-PTXL and named Zef) was built from composite materials by Pierre Calvel and beat even the designer's own CP.80 into the air. Calvel's CP-80 was entered in the French Formula One air races in 1976, but failed to qualify.

Variants
Piel CP.80
Single seat racer, typically powered by a  Continental O-200 for Formula One Air Racing.
Piel CP.801
Piel CP.802

Specifications (CP.80)

References

Piel aircraft
1970s French sport aircraft
Homebuilt aircraft
Low-wing aircraft
Single-engined tractor aircraft
Aircraft first flown in 1974